Acronychia chooreechillum, commonly known as mountain aspen, is a species of shrub or small rainforest tree that is endemic to north-eastern Queensland. It has mostly trifoliate leaves with elliptic to egg-shaped leaflets on stems that are more or less cylindrical, flowers in small groups in leaf axils and fleshy, egg-shaped or elliptical fruit.

Description

Taxonomy
Mountain aspen was first formally described in 1889 by Frederick Manson Bailey in Archibald Meston's report to the Queensland Government on his Government Scientific Expedition to the Bellenden-Ker Range (Woonooroonan). In 1933, Cyril Tenison White changed the name to Acronychia chooreechillum in the journal Contributions from the Arnold Arboretum of Harvard University. The specific epithet (chooreechillum) is derived from an Aboriginal name for Mount Bartle Frere.

Distribution and habitat

Conservation status
Mountain aspen is classified as of "least concern" under the Queensland Government Nature Conservation Act 1992.

References

chooreechillum
Flora of Queensland
Plants described in 1913
Taxa named by Frederick Manson Bailey